Revealed is an Australian news and current affairs television series. It first aired on Network Ten on 12 September 2013, hosted by Hugh Riminton.

Revealed features interviews, profiles and investigative reports on a wide variety of topical issues. It combines locally produced stories with stories from America's CBS News.

See also
 Ten Eyewitness News
 List of Australian television series

References

External links
 Official Website

Network 10 original programming
10 News First
Australian television news shows
2013 Australian television series debuts
2013 Australian television series endings
Television shows set in Sydney
English-language television shows